The dwarf hutia (Mesocapromys nana) is a small, critically endangered, rat-like mammal known only from Cuba. Aside from tracks, it was last seen in 1937 and may be extinct. It gives birth to only a single offspring at a time, and is threatened by habitat loss and non-native species such as rats and mongoose. The dwarf hutia belongs to the hutia subfamily (Capromyinae), a group of rodents native to the Caribbean that are mostly endangered or extinct.

Description
The hutias are heavily built guinea pig-like rodents with broad rounded heads. They have relatively small eyes and short rounded ears. The average tail and body length of this hutia is unknown. Some hutias have prehensile tails, meaning they are able to use them for gripping and climbing. Unlike the larger litter sizes of many other rodents, the dwarf hutia gave birth to only a single offspring.

Conservation
The dwarf hutia became Critically Endangered due to loss of habitat and the introduction of mongooses and black rats.  The discovery of tracks and droppings in the Zapata Swamp gives hopes that this species has survived.  It was initially described based on fossil material, but was later found to be extant.

References 

Mesocapromys
Mammals of Cuba
Hutia, dwarf
Mammals described in 1917
Taxa named by Glover Morrill Allen
Endemic fauna of Cuba